A gubernatorial election was held on 13 April 2003 to elect the Governor of Hokkaido Prefecture.

Candidates
Harumi Takahashi – former director of Hokkaido Bureau of Economy, Trade and Industry, age 49.
Yoshio Hachiro – member of the House of Representatives, age 55.
 – former vice-governor of Hokkaido, age 58.
 – lawyer and former representative, age 59.
 – president of the Hokkaido Prefectural Assembly and later mayor of Shinhidaka, Hokkaido, age 58.
 – chairman of the Hokkaido Teachers Association, age 64.
 – ex-director of the Hokkaido Finance Bureau, age 58.
 – unemployed and later 2009 town council candidate at Yūbetsu, Hokkaido, age 44.
 – agronomist and 1991 Hokkaido gubernatorial election candidate, age 72.

Results

References

Hokkaido gubernational elections
2003 elections in Japan